Stillingia oppositifolia is a species of flowering plant in the family Euphorbiaceae. It was described in 1866. It is native to Brazil.

References

oppositifolia
Plants described in 1866
Flora of Brazil
Taxa named by Henri Ernest Baillon
Taxa named by Johannes Müller Argoviensis